Trachylepis lavarambo is a species of skink found in Madagascar.

References

Trachylepis
Reptiles described in 1998
Taxa named by Ronald Archie Nussbaum
Taxa named by Christopher John Raxworthy